Krasnoye is a rural locality (a selo) and the administrative center of Krasnensky Selsoviet of Tambovsky District, Amur Oblast, Russia. The population was 249 as of 2018. There are 6  streets.

Geography 
Krasnoye is located on the Amur River, 47 km west of Tambovka (the district's administrative centre) by road. Kuropatino is the nearest rural locality.

References 

Rural localities in Tambovsky District, Amur Oblast